Aneroid Mountain is a  peak in the Wallowa Mountains, in Wallowa County, Oregon in the United States.

See also
List of mountain peaks of Oregon

References

Mountains of Oregon
Geography of Wallowa County, Oregon
Wallowa–Whitman National Forest
North American 2000 m summits